Following its withdrawal from the European Union on 31 January 2020, the United Kingdom began negotiations on several free trade agreements to remove or reduce tariff and non-tariff barriers to trade, both to establish new agreements and to replace previous EU trade agreements.  Withdrawal ended 47 years of membership during which all its trading agreements were negotiated by the European Commission on behalf of the bloc as a whole. The UK did not actually withdraw from the European Single Market and the European Union Customs Union (and its trade agreements) until 31 December 2020.

, the United Kingdom has concluded four new trade agreements: with Japan; with its biggest trading partner, the EU; New Zealand and with Australia. In addition, it has agreed 35 'trade continuity agreements. covering 67 nations by June 2021. In addition, it has begun other negotiations, notably to join the Comprehensive and Progressive Agreement for Trans-Pacific Partnership. The former  Johnson ministry describes itself as a proponent of free trade.

The UK's negotiating team will consult with its Strategic Trade Advisory Group throughout the negotiations.

Competence and ratification process 
According to UK law the United Kingdom Parliament has the power to pass law in all policy areas.

Ratification
The responsibility for concluding treaties involving the UK lies with the Secretary of State for Foreign, Commonwealth and Development Affairs. This remains the case even when the negotiation of the treaty is led by another government department.

The FCO's Legal Advisers and Treaty Section:

must be given the opportunity to comment on the drafts of all treaties under negotiation
will advise on the form and substance of the treaty, though not substance which is technical and of which the other government department is the expert
will advise on related matters such as the production of Full Powers and Instruments of Ratification
will produce original signature copies of treaties and advise on the treaty signing ceremony
will arrange for the treaty to be published and laid before Parliament;
is responsible for the registration of these treaties with the UN, allowing their subsequent publication in the United Nations Treaty Series
will transfer of the treaties to the National Archives for preservation

Unless expressly authorised to do so by HMG in the UK, Crown Dependencies and Overseas Territories do not have the authority to become a party to treaties in their own right. The UK must extend the territorial scope of its ratification of treaties to include them. This is normally done either at the time of ratification, or at some later date.

Obsolete agreements

Signed agreements 

, the UK had 38 trade agreements with 97 countries, some through the use of a mutatis mutandis concept, in order to quickly replicate the existing agreements between the EU and these countries, only having to call out those minor areas of differentiation (this allowed some agreements to be reduced to around 40 pages from the original around 1400). Among them are significant economies — by nominal GDP — such as the European Union, South Korea, Switzerland, Israel and South Africa.

Most of these treaties have not formally entered into force on 1 January 2021. However, for many these treaties will be provisionally applied, or through a "bridging mechanism" (exchange of diplomatic notes verbale etc.) continuity is achieved.

Signed agreements that are being joined by new countries

Mutual recognition agreements 
Mutual recognition in relation to Conformity assessment, Certificates and Markings

Agreements being negotiated

Agreements at pre-negotiation stage

UK top trading partners 

The figures above are for 2021 & 2022

Neglecting human rights 

The UK long maintained the idea of incorporating a values-driven trade policy. In October 2021, the Secretary of State for International Trade, Anne-Marie Trevelyan also said trade “will not come at the expense of human rights. She had stated that discussions on free trade agreements will bring an opportunity to raise such issues. However, in 2022, a leaked letter to MPs from Trevelyan revealed that the post-Brexit trade deals will not be used to enforce human rights. Trevelyan wrote, “Free trade agreements are not generally the most effective or targeted tool to advance human rights issues.” The change in UK’s policy came as the country was looking to seal a deal with Middle Eastern countries with poor human rights records, including Saudi Arabia, the United Arab Emirates and Bahrain. The move was condemned by human rights campaigners, who said, “Gulf dictators will be confidently reassured that when it comes to business with the UK, human rights will be left completely off the table.” Amnesty International UK’s economic affairs director, Peter Frankental also said that Britain was “sending a terrible message to other countries”.

See also 
 List of free trade agreements
 List of multilateral trade agreements
 List of bilateral trade agreements

Notes

References 

 
Treaties of the United Kingdom
Foreign relations of the United Kingdom